Észak-Dunántúl wine region is one of the seven larger wine regions of Hungary. It consists of four wine regions around Buda and the upper Danube: Etyek-Buda, Neszmély, Mór and Pannonhalma. On its limestone-based soil exclusively white wines are produced. International varieties – Chardonnay, Sauvignon blanc, Rhine riesling, Tramini and Muscat Ottonel – play a significant role, but traditional local varieties are also present, such as Olaszrizling, Leányka and in Mór also Ezerjó.

Wine regions

References 

Wine regions of Hungary